What Happens to My Family? is a 2014–2015 South Korean television series starring Yoo Dong-geun, Kim Hyun-joo, Yoon Park and Park Hyung-sik. It aired on KBS2 on Saturdays and Sundays at 19:55 (KST) time slot from August 16, 2014, to February 15, 2015.

Synopsis
Cha Soon-bong (Yoo Dong-geun) is a widower who has devoted his life to his three children. His eldest daughter Kang-shim (Kim Hyun-joo), after a failed relationship, has resigned herself to never marry and a lifetime of being alone; his eldest son Kang-jae (Yoon Park), a brilliant oncologist, is resentful of his humble origins; and his youngest son, Dal-bong (Park Hyung-sik).

Cast

Main
 Yoo Dong-geun as Cha Soon-bong
The patriarch of the Cha family and head of the household; owner of a tofu shop.
 Kim Hyun-joo as Cha Kang-shim
The eldest child; company secretary to CEO Moon Tae-oh and, in later episodes, to director Moon Tae-joo.
 Yoon Park as Cha Kang-jae
The second child; a skilled oncologist.
 Park Hyung-sik as Cha Dal-bong
The youngest child; he is struggling with finding a stable job.

Supporting

Cha family 
 Yang Hee-kyung as Cha Soon-geum
Soon-bong's younger sister; Young-seol's mother and aunt to Kang-shim, Kang-jae and Dal-bong.
 Kim Jung-nan as Noh Young-seol
Soon-geum's daughter and cousin to Kang-shim, Kang-jae and Dal-bong.
 Kim Jung-min as Seo Joong-baek
Young-seol's husband; owner of a chicken restaurant.

People around Cha Kang-shim 
 Kim Sang-kyung as Moon Tae-joo
Director at GK Group; CEO Moon's son.
 Kim Yong-gun as Moon Tae-oh
CEO of GK Group; Tae-joo's father and Kang-shim's boss.
Na Young-hee as Baek Seol-hee
 Eun-ho's mother; a famous news anchor and TV personality.
 Song Jae-hee as Byun Woo-tak
Kang-shim's ex-boyfriend; an attorney who handles Soon-bong's case against the Cha children.

People around Cha Kang-jae 
 Son Dam-bi as Kwon Hyo-jin
Kang-jae's fiancée; daughter of Kwon Ki-chan and Heo Yang-geum; a food stylist.
 Kim Il-woo as Kwon Ki-chan
Hyo-jin's father and husband to Heo Yang-geum; director of the hospital where Kang-jae works.
 Kyeon Mi-ri as Heo Yang-geum
Director Kwon's wife and Hyo-jin's mother.

People around Cha Dal-bong 
 Nam Ji-hyun as Kang Seo-wool
 Kim Bo-yoon as young Kang Seo-wool
A country girl with a strong Chungcheong dialect; she moves to Seoul in the hopes of marrying Dal-bong.
 Seo Kang-joon as Yoon Eun-ho
Baek Seol-hee's son; an idol turned restaurant owner.

Others 
 Kim Seo-ra as Miss Ko (Ko Bok-ja / Ko Eun-hwan)
A mysterious woman who became Soon-bong's close friend.
 Jang In-sub as The Sword

Special appearance 
 Hwang Kwang-hee as Vitamin Salesman  (Ep. 2)

Ratings
 In this table,  represent the lowest ratings and  represent the highest ratings.
 The drama aired with English subtitles on KBS World two weeks after its initial broadcast in Korea.

Awards and nominations

Adaption
In 2015, a Turkish television series with the title The Baba Candir, based on the drama was released. There is a Mexican adaptation called Que le pasa a mi Familia? which was released on 2021.

International broadcast

References

External links
  
 
 

Korean Broadcasting System television dramas
2014 South Korean television series debuts
2015 South Korean television series endings
Korean-language television shows
Television shows written by Kang Eun-kyung
South Korean romance television series
South Korean comedy television series
Television shows set in Seoul
Television series by Samhwa Networks